Philip Oliver Hale (born 1963) is an American figurative painter who currently resides in London, England.

Early life and education

Early work
Prior to turning to fine arts he worked as an illustrator, doing mostly figurative work. He was apprenticed to/ partnered with American painter Rick Berry.

Current work
His current work focuses on figure as well, in depictions of slightly surreal scenes with strange characters performing various physical feats, usually in a confrontation of some sort.

A portrait of former UK Prime Minister, Tony Blair by the artist was unveiled in Westminster on April 23, 2008. Mr Blair sat for the portrait during his final months in office in 2007.

He also recently formed the movie production company "unprofessional.com" with his son Callum Hale Thomson. It specializes in bespoke analogue filmmaking.

In 2015, Hale displayed 15 oil paintings and at least 18 pencil drawings in an exhibition titled Life Wants to Live. The exhibition showed at Jonathan LeVine's Gallery in New York and was later published as a book.

Published works

Major works

Double Memory: Art and Collaboration by Rick Berry and Phil Hale
A Monster at Christmas by  Phil Hale and Thom Canty
Goad: The Many Moods of Phil Hale by Phil Hale
Mockingbirds/ Relaxeder by Phil Hale
Sparrow: Phil Hale by Phil Hale
The Dark Tower II: The Drawing of the Three by Stephen King, interior illustrations by Phil Hale
Urge Ourselves Under by Phil Hale
Empire by Phil Hale
Black Crack by Phil Hale

Audio
Golden Phone Plays Mockingbirds by Golden Phone (a band in which Phil Hale and Jon Wygens play)

Book covers
Arbitrary Crude by Enders Buzcienski
By the Time I got to Phoenix by Paolo Belhassaine
Candyass, 2 a.m. by Willem Barough
Conspicuity by Sanford Pel
Farther the Shoals, Darker than This by Duane Michael Edley
Fondle by Sanford Pel
Goya by B. Grutbauer
Hero is Angry by Y.Carlos Cantor 
Heart of Darkness" by Joseph ConradHong on the Range by William F WuI am Drugs by Jayne ReeserInsomnia by Stephen King
Lungs, Lips and Liver by Rena Davrin
Makes Me Want to Cry by Bob Mertz
Mofo by Hooglander Ivanov
New Black Car by James Higgins (as yet unpaid)
Relaxeder by Carsten Glock
Shrivel and Deplete by B. Grutbauer
Tendresse by Gene Scott Tzerati
The Male and Female Uro-genital systems: Collected Essays 1992-97 by Rafael Onlhy
The Male and Female Uro-genital systems: Collected Essays 1997-99 by Rafael Onlhy
The Pornographic Diagram is Incorrect by Rena Davrin
Mary the Very Hairy Fairy by Phil Hale and Avalon Hale Thomson

He was commissioned by Penguin Classics to paint new covers for new editions of six Joseph Conrad books, published in 2007: Heart of Darkness and The Congo Diary, Typhoon and Other Stories, Lord Jim, Under Western Eyes, The Nigger of the 'Narcissus' and Other Stories, Nostromo and The Secret Agent.

Comic Books
Covers
Flinch #1, #11
Strange Adventures (1999 series) #2
Swamp Thing/Lucifer Preview
Weird War Tales (2000 series)
Swamp Thing (2000 series) #1, #2, #3
Vertigo Secret Files: Hellblazer #1
Legends of the DC Universe #33, #34, #35, #36
Vertigo: Secret Files & Origins: Swamp Thing #1
Batman: Legends of the Dark Knight #168
Halo Graphic Novel
Interiors
"Reunion", Epic Illustrated #22
"In the Future", Epic Illustrated #29
"Knock Knock", Epic Illustrated #29
"Johnny Badhair", Epic Illustrated #33

Magazines
Covers
Epic December 1985
Interiors
Playboy (July 98)
Playboy (Sep 98)
Playboy (Feb 05)
Imbroglio Magazine (June 5)
Imbroglio Magazine (April 9)
Tripwire Magazine (July 9)

Other published work
Poster for Spectrum 13: Call for Entries
Featured in certain issues of Spectrum annual
Poster for Lucca Comics and Games 2009
"Understand?" album by Naked Raygun, illustrations by Phil Hale

References

External links
PHIL HALE STUDIO OFFICIAL WEBSITE
2012 Studio Tour Website
Allen Spiegel Fine Arts
Donald M. Grant Publisher, Inc
National Portrait Gallery

American contemporary painters
Living people
1963 births